Claudio Gugerotti (born 7 October 1955) is an Italian prelate of the Catholic Church who was named prefect of the Dicastery for the Eastern Churches in November 2022. He previously worked in the diplomatic service of the Holy See, holding the position of nuncio in several eastern European countries between 2001 and 2020 and in Great Britain from 2020 to 2022. He joined the staff of the Dicastery for the Eastern Churches in 1985 and was its undersecretary from 1997 to 2001. He has been an archbishop since 2001.

Biography 
Claudio Gugerotti was born in Verona, Italy, on 7 October 1955 and was ordained a priest for the Diocese of Verona on 29 May 1982. He earned degrees in Eastern languages and literature and in sacred liturgy. He taught patristics at the San Zeno Theological Institute in Verona from 1981 to 1984, and theology and Eastern liturgy at the Institute of Ecumenical Studies in Verona from 1982 to 1985. In 1985, he joined the Roman Curia, working at the Congregation for the Eastern Churches; he became its undersecretary on 17 December 1997. He has also taught patristics and Armenian language and literature at the Pontifical Oriental Institute.

Gugerotti had not trained at the Pontifical Ecclesiastical Academy as is standard practice for nuncios. On 7 December 2001, Pope John Paul II appointed him Apostolic Nuncio to Georgia and to Armenia, as well as Titular Archbishop of Ravello. He was also appointed Apostolic Nuncio to Azerbaijan on 13 December. He received his episcopal consecration from John Paul on 6 January 2002.

Pope Benedict XVI appointed him Apostolic Nuncio to Belarus on 15 July 2011.

On 13 November 2015, Pope Francis appointed him Apostolic Nuncio to Ukraine.

On 4 July 2020, Pope Francis appointed him Apostolic Nuncio to Great Britain.

On 21 November 2022, Pope Francis appointed him Prefect of the Dicastery for the Eastern Churches.

See also
 List of heads of the diplomatic missions of the Holy See

References

External links

 Catholic Hierarchy: Archbishop Claudio Gugerotti 

Religious leaders from Verona
Apostolic Nuncios to Ukraine
Apostolic Nuncios to Belarus
Apostolic Nuncios to Armenia
Apostolic Nuncios to Georgia (country)
Apostolic Nuncios to Azerbaijan
Apostolic Nuncios to Great Britain
1955 births
Living people
Officials of the Roman Curia
Members of the Congregation for the Oriental Churches